Languages spoken in the Republic of India belong to several language families, the major ones being the Indo-Aryan languages spoken by 78.05% of Indians and the Dravidian languages spoken by 19.64% of Indians, both families together are sometimes known as Indic languages. Languages spoken by the remaining 2.31% of the population belong to the Austroasiatic, Sino–Tibetan, Tai–Kadai, and a few other minor language families and isolates. As per the People's Linguistic Survey of India, India has the second highest number of languages (780), after Papua New Guinea (840). Ethnologue lists a lower number of 456.

Article 343 of the Constitution of India stated that the official language of the Union is Hindi in Devanagari script, with official use of English to continue for 15 years from 1947. Later, a constitutional amendment, The Official Languages Act, 1963, allowed for the continuation of English alongside Hindi in the Indian government indefinitely until legislation decides to change it. The form of numerals to be used for the official purposes of the Union are "the international form of Indian numerals", which are referred to as Arabic numerals in most English-speaking countries. Despite the misconceptions, Hindi is not the national language of India; the Constitution of India does not give any language the status of national language.

The Eighth Schedule of the Indian Constitution lists 22 languages, which have been referred to as scheduled languages and given recognition, status and official encouragement. In addition, the Government of India has awarded the distinction of classical language to Kannada, Malayalam, Odia, Sanskrit, Tamil and Telugu. Classical language status is given to languages which have a rich heritage and independent nature.

According to the Census of India of 2001, India has 122 major languages and 1599 other languages. However, figures from other sources vary, primarily due to differences in definition of the terms "language" and "dialect". The 2001 Census recorded 30 languages which were spoken by more than a million native speakers and 122 which were spoken by more than 10,000 people. Two contact languages have played an important role in the history of India: Persian and English. Persian was the court language during the Mughal period in India. It reigned as an administrative language for several centuries until the era of British colonisation. English continues to be an important language in India. It is used in higher education and in some areas of the Indian government. Hindi, which has the largest number of first-language speakers in India today, serves as the lingua franca across much of North and Central India. However, there have been concerns raised with Hindi being imposed in South India, most notably in the states of Tamil Nadu and Karnataka, Maharashtra, West Bengal, Assam, Punjab and other non-Hindi regions have also started to voice concerns about Hindi. Bengali is the second most spoken and understood language in the country with a significant amount of speakers in eastern and northeastern regions. Marathi is the third most spoken and understood language in the country with a significant amount of speakers in South-Western regions.

History

The Southern Indian languages are from the Dravidian family. The Dravidian languages are indigenous to the Indian subcontinent. Proto-Dravidian languages were spoken in India in the 4th millennium BCE and started disintegrating into various branches around 3rd millennium BCE. The Dravidian languages are classified in four groups: North, Central (Kolami–Parji), South-Central (Telugu–Kui), and South Dravidian (Tamil-Kannada).

The Northern Indian languages from the Indo-Aryan branch of the Indo-European family evolved from Old Indo-Aryan by way of the Middle Indo-Aryan Prakrit languages and Apabhraṃśa of the Middle Ages. The Indo-Aryan languages developed and emerged in three stages — Old Indo-Aryan (1500 BCE to 600 BCE), Middle Indo-Aryan stage (600 BCE and 1000 CE), and New Indo-Aryan (between 1000 CE and 1300 CE). The modern north Indian Indo-Aryan languages all evolved into distinct, recognisable languages in the New Indo-Aryan Age.

In the Northeast India, among the Sino-Tibetan languages, Meitei language (officially known as Manipuri language) was the court language of the Manipur Kingdom. It was honoured before and during the darbar sessions before Manipur was merged into the Dominion of the Indian Republic. Its history of existence spans from 1500 to 2000 years according to most eminent scholars including Padma Vibhushan awardee Suniti Kumar Chatterji. Even according to the "Manipur State Constitution Act, 1947" of the once independent Manipur, Manipuri and English were made the court languages of the kingdom (before merging into Indian Republic).

Persian, or Farsi, was brought into India by the Ghaznavids and other Turko-Afghan dynasties as the court language. Culturally Persianized, they, in combination with the later Mughal dynasty (of Turco-Mongol origin), influenced the art, history, and literature of the region for more than 500 years, resulting in the Persianisation of many Indian tongues, mainly lexically. In 1837, the British replaced Persian with English and Hindustani in Perso-Arabic script for administrative purposes and the Hindi movement of the 19th Century replaced Persianised vocabulary with Sanskrit derivations and replaced or supplemented the use of Perso-Arabic script for administrative purposes with Devanagari.

Each of the northern Indian languages had different influences. For example, Hindustani was strongly influenced by Sanskrit, Arabic and Persian, leading to the emergence of Modern Standard Hindi and Modern Standard Urdu as registers of the Hindustani language.
Bangla on the other hand has retained its Sanskritic roots while heavily expanding its vocabulary with words from Persian, English, French and other foreign languages.

Inventories

The first official survey of language diversity in the Indian subcontinent was carried out by Sir George Abraham Grierson from 1898 to 1928. Titled the Linguistic Survey of India, it reported a total of 179 languages and 544 dialects. However, the results were skewed due to ambiguities in distinguishing between "dialect" and "language", use of untrained personnel and under-reporting of data from South India, as the former provinces of Burma and Madras, as well as the princely states of Cochin, Hyderabad, Mysore and Travancore were not included in the survey.

Different sources give widely differing figures, primarily based on how the terms "language" and "dialect" are defined and grouped. Ethnologue, produced by the Christian evangelist organisation SIL International, lists 461 tongues for India (out of 6,912 worldwide), 447 of which are living, while 14 are extinct. The 447 living languages are further subclassified in Ethnologue as follows:
 Institutional – 63
 Developing – 130
 Vigorous – 187
 In trouble – 54
 Dying – 13

The People's Linguistic Survey of India, a privately owned research institution in India, has recorded over 66 different scripts and more than 780 languages in India during its nationwide survey, which the organisation claims to be the biggest linguistic survey in India.

The People of India (POI) project of Anthropological Survey of India reported 325 languages which are used for in-group communication by 5,633 Indian communities.

Census of India figures
The Census of India records and publishes data with respect to the number of speakers for languages and dialects, but uses its own unique terminology, distinguishing between language and mother tongue. The mother tongues are grouped within each language. Many of the mother tongues so defined could be considered a language rather than a dialect by linguistic standards. This is especially so for many mother tongues with tens of millions of speakers that are officially grouped under the language Hindi.

1951 Census
Separate figures for Hindi, Urdu, and Punjabi were not issued, due to the fact the returns were intentionally recorded incorrectly in states such as East Punjab, Himachal Pradesh, Delhi, PEPSU, and Bilaspur.

1961 Census
The 1961 census recognised 1,652 mother tongues spoken by 438,936,918 people, counting all declarations made by any individual at the time when the census was conducted. However, the declaring individuals often mixed names of languages with those of dialects, subdialects and dialect clusters or even castes, professions, religions, localities, regions, countries and nationalities. The list therefore includes languages with barely a few individual speakers as well as 530 unclassified mother tongues and more than 100 idioms that are non-native to India, including linguistically unspecific demonyms such as "African", "Canadian" or "Belgian".

1991 Census
The 1991 census recognises 1,576 classified mother tongues. According to the 1991 census, 22 languages had more than a million native speakers, 50 had more than 100,000 and 114 had more than 10,000 native speakers. The remaining accounted for a total of 566,000 native speakers (out of a total of 838 million Indians in 1991).

2001 Census
As per the census of 2001, there are 1635 rationalised mother tongues, 234 identifiable mother tongues and 22 major languages. Of these, 29 languages have more than a million native speakers, 60 have more than 100,000 and 122 have more than 10,000 native speakers. There are a few languages like Kodava that do not have a script but have a group of native speakers in Coorg (Kodagu).

2011 Census
According to the most recent census of 2011, after thorough linguistic scrutiny, edit, and rationalization on 19,569 raw linguistic affiliations, the census recognizes 1369 rationalized mother tongues and 1474 names which were treated as ‘unclassified’ and relegated to ‘other’ mother tongue category. Among, the 1369 rationalized mother tongues which are spoken by 10,000 or more speakers, are further grouped into appropriate set that resulted into total 121 languages. In these 121 languages, 22 are already part of the Eighth Schedule to the Constitution of India and the other 99 are termed as "Total of other languages" which is one short as of the other languages recognized in 2001 census.

Multilingualism

2011 Census India

Ethnologue (2019, 22nd edition) worldwide 
The following table is a list of languages from the Indian subcontinent by total number of speakers as it appears in the 2019 edition of Ethnologue, a language reference published by SIL International, which is based in the United States.

Language families
Ethnolinguistically, the languages of South Asia, echoing the complex history and geography of the region, form a complex patchwork of language families, language phyla and isolates. Languages spoken in India belong to several language families, the major ones being the Indo-Aryan languages spoken by 78.05% of Indians and the Dravidian languages spoken by 19.64% of Indians. The languages of India belong to several language families, the most important of which are:

Indo-Aryan language family

The largest of the language families represented in India, in terms of speakers, is the Indo-Aryan language family, a branch of the Indo-Iranian family, itself the easternmost, extant subfamily of the Indo-European language family.
This language family predominates, accounting for some 1035 million speakers, or over 76.5 of the population, as per a 2018 estimate.
The most widely spoken languages of this group are Hindi, Bengali, Bhojpuri, Marathi, Urdu, Gujarati, Punjabi, Kashmiri, Rajasthani, Sindhi, Assamese (Asamiya), Maithili and Odia. Aside from the Indo-Aryan languages, other Indo-European languages are also spoken in India, the most prominent of which is English, as a lingua franca.

Dravidian language family

The second largest language family is the Dravidian language family, accounting for some 277 million speakers, or approximately 20.5% as per 2018 estimate. The Dravidian languages are spoken mainly in southern India and parts of eastern and central India as well as in parts of northeastern Sri Lanka, Pakistan, Nepal and Bangladesh. The Dravidian languages with the most speakers are Telugu, Tamil, Kannada and Malayalam. Besides the mainstream population, Dravidian languages are also spoken by small scheduled tribe communities, such as the Oraon and Gond tribes. Only two Dravidian languages are exclusively spoken outside India, Brahui in Balochistan, Pakistan and Dhangar, a dialect of Kurukh, in Nepal.

Austroasiatic language family
Families with smaller numbers of speakers are Austroasiatic and numerous small Sino-Tibetan languages, with some 10 and 6 million speakers, respectively, together 3% of the population.

The Austroasiatic language family (austro meaning South) is the autochthonous language in Southeast Asia, arrived by migration. Austroasiatic languages of mainland India are the Khasi and Munda languages, including Bhumij and Santali. The languages of the Nicobar islands also form part of this language family. With the exceptions of Khasi and Santali, all Austroasiatic languages on Indian territory are endangered.

Tibeto-Burman language family
The Tibeto-Burman language family are well represented in India. However, their interrelationships are not discernible, and the family has been described as "a patch of leaves on the forest floor" rather than with the conventional metaphor of a "family tree".

Padma Vibhushan awardee Indian Bengali scholar Suniti Kumar Chatterjee said, "Among the various Tibeto-Burman languages, the most important and in literature certainly of much greater importance than Newari, is the Meitei or Manipuri language".

In India, Tibeto-Burman languages are spoken across the Himalayas in the regions of Arunachal Pradesh, Assam (hills and autonomous councils), Himachal Pradesh, Ladakh, Manipur, Meghalaya, Mizoram, Nagaland, Sikkim, Tripura and West Bengal.

Sino-Tibetan languages spoken in India include two constitutionally recognised official languages, Meitei (officially known as Manipuri) and Bodo as well as the non-scheduled languages like Karbi, Lepcha, and many varieties of several related Tibetic, West Himalayish, Tani, Brahmaputran, Angami–Pochuri, Tangkhul, Zeme, Kukish sub linguistic branches, amongst many others.

Tai-Kadai language family

The Ahom language, a Southwestern Tai language, had been once the dominant language of the Ahom Kingdom in modern-day Assam, but was later replaced by the Assamese language (known as Kamrupi in ancient era which is the pre-form of the Kamrupi dialect of today). Nowadays, small Tai communities and their languages remain in Assam and Arunachal Pradesh together with Sino-Tibetans, e.g. Tai Phake, Tai Aiton and Tai Khamti, which are similar to the Shan language of Shan State, Myanmar; the Dai language of Yunnan, China; the Lao language of Laos; the Thai language of Thailand; and the Zhuang language in Guangxi, China.

Andamanese language families
The languages of the Andaman Islands form another group:
 the Great Andamanese languages, comprising a number of extinct, and one highly endangered language Aka-Jeru.
 the Ongan family of the southern Andaman Islands, comprising two extant languages, Önge and Jarawa, and one extinct language, Jangil.

In addition, Sentinelese is thought likely to be related to the above languages.

Language isolates
The only language found in the Indian mainland that is considered a language isolate is Nihali. The status of Nihali is ambiguous, having been considered as a distinct Austroasiatic language, as a dialect of Korku and also as being a "thieves' argot" rather than a legitimate language.

The other language isolates found in the rest of South Asia include Burushaski, a language spoken in Gilgit–Baltistan (administered by Pakistan), Kusunda (in western Nepal), and Vedda (in Sri Lanka). The validity of the Great Andamanese language group as a language family has been questioned and it has been considered a language isolate by some authorities.

In addition, a Bantu language, Sidi, was spoken until the mid-20th century in Gujarat by the Siddi.

Official languages

Federal level

Prior to Independence, in British India, English was the sole language used for administrative purposes as well as for higher education purposes.

In 1946, the issue of national language was a bitterly contested subject in the proceedings of the Constituent Assembly of India, specifically what should be the language in which the Constitution of India is written and the language spoken during the proceedings of Parliament and thus deserving of the epithet "national". Members belonging to the northern parts of India insisted that the Constitution be drafted in Hindi with the unofficial translation in English. This was not agreed to by the drafting committee on the grounds that English was much better to craft the nuanced prose on constitutional subjects. The efforts to make Hindi the pre-eminent language were bitterly resisted by the members from those parts of India where Hindi was not spoken natively.

Eventually, a compromise was reached not to include any mention of a national language. Instead, Hindi in Devanagari script was declared to be the official language of the union, but for "fifteen years from the commencement of the Constitution, the English Language shall continue to be used for all the official purposes of the Union for which it was being used immediately before such commencement."

Article 343 (1) of the Constitution of India states "The Official Language of the Union government shall be Hindi in Devanagari script." Unless Parliament decided otherwise, the use of English for official purposes was to cease 15 years after the constitution came into effect, i.e. on 26 January 1965.

As the date for changeover approached, however, there was much alarm in the non Hindi-speaking areas of India, especially in Kerala, Gujarat, Maharashtra, Tamil Nadu, Punjab, West Bengal, Karnataka, Puducherry and Andhra Pradesh. Accordingly, Jawaharlal Nehru ensured the enactment of the Official Languages Act, 1963, which provided that English "may" still be used with Hindi for official purposes, even after 1965. The wording of the text proved unfortunate in that while Nehru understood that "may" meant shall, politicians championing the cause of Hindi thought it implied exactly the opposite.

In the event, as 1965 approached, India's new Prime Minister Lal Bahadur Shastri prepared to make Hindi paramount with effect from 26 January 1965. This led to widespread agitation, riots, self-immolations, and suicides in Tamil Nadu. The split of Congress politicians from the South from their party stance, the resignation of two Union ministers from the South, and the increasing threat to the country's unity forced Shastri to concede.

As a result, the proposal was dropped, and the Act itself was amended in 1967 to provide that the use of English would not be ended until a resolution to that effect was passed by the legislature of every state that had not adopted Hindi as its official language, and by each house of the Indian Parliament.

The Constitution of India does not give any language the status of national language.

Hindi

In the 2001 census, 422 million (422,048,642) people in India reported Hindi to be their native language. This figure not only included Hindi speakers of Hindustani, but also people who identify as native speakers of related languages who consider their speech to be a dialect of Hindi, the Hindi belt. Hindi (or Hindustani) is the native language of most people living in Delhi, Western Uttar Pradesh, Uttarakhand, Chhattisgarh, Himachal Pradesh, Chandigarh, Bihar, Jharkhand, Madhya Pradesh, Haryana, and Rajasthan.

"Modern Standard Hindi", a standardised language is one of the official languages of the Union of India. In addition, it is one of only two languages used for business in Parliament. However, the Rajya Sabha now allows all 22 official languages on the Eighth Schedule to be spoken.

Hindustani, evolved from khari boli (खड़ी बोली), a prominent tongue of Mughal times, which itself evolved from Apabhraṃśa, an intermediary transition stage from Prakrit, from which the major North Indian Indo-Aryan languages have evolved.

Varieties of Hindi spoken in India include Rajasthani, Braj Bhasha, Haryanvi, Bundeli, Kannauji, Hindustani, Awadhi, Bagheli and Chhattisgarhi.  By virtue of its being a lingua franca, Hindi has also developed regional dialects such as Bambaiya Hindi in Mumbai. In addition, a trade language, Andaman Creole Hindi has also developed in the Andaman Islands.

In addition, by use in popular culture such as songs and films, Hindi also serves as a lingua franca across both North and Central India.

Hindi is widely taught both as a primary language and language of instruction and as a second tongue in most states.

English

British colonialism in India resulted in English becoming a language for governance, business, and education. English, along with Hindi, is one of the two languages permitted in the Constitution of India for business in Parliament. Despite the fact that Hindi has official Government patronage and serves as a lingua franca over large parts of India, there was considerable opposition to the use of Hindi in the southern states of India, and English has emerged as a de facto lingua franca over much of India. Journalist Manu Joseph, in a 2011 article in The New York Times, wrote that due to the prominence and usage of the language and the desire for English-language education, "English is the de facto national language of India. It is a bitter truth." English language proficiency is highest among urban residents, wealthier Indians, Indians with higher levels of educational attainment, Christians, men and younger Indians. In 2017, more than 58 percent of rural teens could read basic English, and 53 percent of fourteen year-olds & sixty percent of 18 year-olds could read English sentences. Despite this, only a little over 10% of Indians can speak English fluently.

Scheduled languages

Until the Twenty-first Amendment of the Constitution of India in 1967, the country recognised 14 official regional languages. The Eighth Schedule and the Seventy-First Amendment provided for the inclusion of Sindhi, Konkani, Meitei and Nepali, thereby increasing the number of official regional languages of India to 18. The Eighth Schedule of the Constitution of India, as of 1 December 2007, lists 22 languages, which are given in the table below together with the regions where they are used.

The individual states, the borders of most of which are or were drawn on socio-linguistic lines, can legislate their own official languages, depending on their linguistic demographics. The official languages chosen reflect the predominant as well as politically significant languages spoken in that state. Certain states having a linguistically defined territory may have only the predominant language in that state as its official language, examples being Karnataka and Gujarat, which have Kannada and Gujarati as their sole official language respectively. Telangana, with a sizeable Urdu-speaking Muslim population, and Andhra Pradesh has two languages, Telugu and Urdu, as its official languages.

Some states buck the trend by using minority languages as official languages. Jammu and Kashmir used to have Urdu, which is spoken by fewer than 1% of the population, as the sole official language until 2020. Meghalaya uses English spoken by 0.01% of the population. This phenomenon has turned majority languages into "minority languages" in a functional sense.

In addition to states and union territories, India has autonomous administrative regions which may be permitted to select their own official language – a case in point being the Bodoland Territorial Council in Assam which has declared the Bodo language as official for the region, in addition to Assamese and English already in use. and Bengali in the Barak Valley, as its official languages.

Prominent languages of India

Hindi

In British India, English was the sole language used for administrative purposes as well as for higher education purposes. When India became independent in 1947, the Indian legislators had the challenge of choosing a language for official communication as well as for communication between different linguistic regions across India. The choices available were:
 Making "Hindi", which a plurality of the people (41%) identified as their native language, the official language.
 Making English, as preferred by non-Hindi speakers, particularly Kannadigas and Tamils, and those from Mizoram and Nagaland, the official language. See also Anti-Hindi agitations.
 Declare both Hindi and English as official languages and each state is given freedom to choose the official language of the state.

The Indian constitution, in 1950, declared Hindi in Devanagari script to be the official language of the union. Unless Parliament decided otherwise, the use of English for official purposes was to cease 15 years after the constitution came into effect, i.e. on 26 January 1965. The prospect of the changeover, however, led to much alarm in the non Hindi-speaking areas of India, especially in South India whose native tongues are not related to Hindi. As a result, Parliament enacted the Official Languages Act in 1963, which provided for the continued use of English for official purposes along with Hindi, even after 1965.

Bengali

Native to the Bengal region, comprising the nation of Bangladesh and the states of West Bengal, Tripura and Barak Valley region of Assam. Bengali (also spelt as Bangla: বাংলা) is the sixth most spoken language in the world. After the partition of India (1947), refugees from East Pakistan were settled in Tripura, and Jharkhand and the union territory of Andaman and Nicobar Islands. There is also a large number of Bengali-speaking people in Maharashtra and Gujarat where they work as artisans in jewellery industries. Bengali developed from Abahatta, a derivative of Apabhramsha, itself derived from Magadhi Prakrit. The modern Bengali vocabulary contains the vocabulary base from Magadhi Prakrit and Pali, also borrowings from Sanskrit and other major borrowings from Persian, Arabic, Austroasiatic languages and other languages in contact with.

Like most Indian languages, Bengali has a number of dialects. It exhibits diglossia, with the literary and standard form differing greatly from the colloquial speech of the regions that identify with the language. Bengali language has developed a rich cultural base spanning art, music, literature, and religion. Bengali has some of the oldest literature of all modern Indo-Aryan languages, dating from about 10th to 12th century ('Chargapada' Buddhist songs). There have been many movements in defence of this language and in 1999 UNESCO declared 21 Feb as the International Mother Language Day in commemoration of the Bengali Language Movement in 1952.

Magahi 
Magahi language also known as Magadhi is a language spoken in Bihar, Jharkhand and West Bengal states of eastern India, and in the Terai of Nepal. Magadhi Prakrit was the ancestor of Magahi, from which the latter's name derives.

Magahi derived from the ancient Magadhi Prakrit, which was created in the ancient kingdom of Magadha, the core of which was the area south of the Ganges and east of Son River.

Though the number of speakers in Magahi is about 12.6 million, it has not been constitutionally recognised in India.

Historically, Magahi had no famous written literature. There are many popular songs throughout the area in which the language is spoken, and strolling bards recite various long epic poems which are known more or less over the whole of Northern India. In Magahi speaking area, folk singers sing a good number of ballads.

Bhojpuri 
Bhojpuri is an Indo-Aryan language native to the Bhojpur region of India and Nepal. It is chiefly spoken in western Bihar, eastern Uttar Pradesh, western Jharkhand, northeastern Madhya Pradesh, northeastern Chhattisgarh and in the Terai region of Nepal. The Bhojpuri variant of Kaithi is the indigenous script of Bhojpuri language.

Bhojpuri is an Eastern Indo-Aryan language and a descandant of Magadhi Prakrit, a language spoken in eastern India over 2500 years ago.

In India, Bhojpuri is included under Hindi in the census but it is an Indo-Aryan language of eastern zone. Proponents demand for inclusion of Bhojpuri language in the eighth schedule of Indian constitution so it will be officially recognized as its own language and not a dialect of Hindi.

It is recognized as a minority language in Fiji, Guyana, Mauritius, Suriname, Trinidad and Tobago and South Africa.

Marathi

Marathi is an Indo-Aryan language. It is the official language and co-official language in Maharashtra and Goa states of Western India respectively, and is one of the official languages of India. There were 83 million speakers of the language in 2011. Marathi has the third-largest number of native speakers in India and ranks 10th in the list of most spoken languages in the world. Marathi has some of the oldest literature of all modern Indo-Aryan languages; Oldest stone inscriptions from 8th century & literature dating from about 1100 AD (Mukundraj's Vivek Sindhu dates to the 12th century). The major dialects of Marathi are Standard Marathi and the Varhadi dialect. There are other related languages such as Khandeshi, Dangi, Vadvali, Samavedi. Malvani Konkani has been heavily influenced by Marathi varieties. Marathi is one of several languages that descend from Maharashtri Prakrit. The further change led to the Apabhraṃśa languages like Old Marathi.

Marathi Language Day (मराठी दिन/मराठी दिवस (transl. Marathi Dina/Marathi Diwasa) is celebrated on 27 February every year across the Indian states of Maharashtra and Goa. This day is regulated by the State Government. It is celebrated on the birthday of eminent Marathi Poet Vi. Va. Shirwadkar, popularly known as Kusumagraj.

Marathi is the official language of Maharashtra and co-official language in the union territories of Dadra and Nagar Haveli and Daman and Diu. In Goa, Konkani is the sole official language; however, Marathi may also be used for all official purposes.

Over a period of many centuries the Marathi language and people came into contact with many other languages and dialects. The primary influence of Prakrit, Maharashtri, Apabhraṃśa and Sanskrit is understandable. Marathi has also been influenced by the Austroasiatic, Dravidian and foreign languages such as Persian and Arabic. Marathi contains loanwords from Persian, Arabic, English and a little from French and Portuguese.

Meitei 

Meitei language (officially known as Manipuri language) is the most widely spoken Indian Sino-Tibetan language of Tibeto-Burman linguistic sub branch. It is the sole official language in Manipur and is one of the official languages of India. It is one of the two Sino-Tibetan languages with official status in India, beside Bodo. It has been recognized as one of the advanced modern languages of India by the National Sahitya Academy for its rich literature. It uses both Meitei script as well as Bengali script for writing.

Meitei language is currently proposed to be included in the elite category of "Classical Languages" of India. Besides, it is also currently proposed to be an associate official language of Government of Assam. According to Leishemba Sanajaoba, the present titular king of Manipur and a Rajya Sabha member of Manipur state, by recognising Meitei as an associate official language of Assam, the identity, history, culture and tradition of Manipuris residing in Assam could be protected.

Meitei Language Day (Manipuri Language Day) is celebrated on 20 August every year by the Manipuris across the Indian states of Manipur, Assam and Tripura. This day is regulated by the Government of Manipur. It is the commemoration of the day on which Meitei was included in the Eighth Schedule to the Constitution of India on the 20 August 1992.

Telugu

Telugu is the most widely spoken Dravidian language in India and around the world. Telugu is an official language in Andhra Pradesh, Telangana and Yanam, making it one of the few languages (along with Hindi, Bengali, and Urdu) with official status in more than one state. It is also spoken by a significant number of people in the Andaman and Nicobar Islands, Chhattisgarh, Karnataka, Maharashtra, Odisha, Tamil Nadu, Gujarat, and by the Sri Lankan Gypsy people. It is one of six languages with classical status in India. Telugu ranks fourth by the number of native speakers in India (81 million in the 2011 Census), fifteenth in the Ethnologue list of most-spoken languages worldwide and is the most widely spoken Dravidian language.

Tamil

Tamil (also spelt as Thamizh: தமிழ்) is a Dravidian language predominantly spoken in Tamil Nadu, Puducherry and many parts of Sri Lanka. It is also spoken by large minorities in the Andaman and Nicobar Islands, Kerala, Karnataka, Andhra Pradesh, Malaysia, Singapore, Mauritius and throughout the world. Tamil ranks fifth by the number of native speakers in India (61 million in the 2001 Census) and ranks 20th in the list of most spoken languages. It is one of the 22 scheduled languages of India and was the first Indian language to be declared a classical language by the Government of India in 2004. Tamil is one of the longest surviving classical languages in the world. It has been described as "the only language of contemporary India which is recognisably continuous with a classical past". The two earliest manuscripts from India, acknowledged and registered by UNESCO Memory of the World register in 1997 and 2005, are in Tamil.
Tamil is an official language of Tamil Nadu, Puducherry, Andaman and Nicobar Islands, Sri Lanka and Singapore. It is also recognized as a minority language in Canada, Malaysia, Mauritius and South Africa.

Urdu

After independence, Modern Standard Urdu, the Persianised register of Hindustani became the national language of Pakistan. During British colonial times, knowledge of Hindustani or Urdu was a must for officials. Hindustani was made the second language of British Indian Empire after English and considered as the language of administration. The British introduced the use of Roman script for Hindustani as well as other languages. Urdu had 70 million speakers in India (as per the Census of 2001), and, along with Hindi, is one of the 22 officially recognised regional languages of India and also an official language in the Indian states of Andhra Pradesh, Jammu and Kashmir, Delhi, Uttar Pradesh, Bihar and Telangana that have significant Muslim populations.

Gujarati

Gujarati is an Indo-Aryan language. It is native to the west Indian region of Gujarat. Gujarati is part of the greater Indo-European language family. Gujarati is descended from Old Gujarati (c. 1100 – 1500 CE), the same source as that of Rajasthani. Gujarati is the chief and official language in the Indian state of Gujarat. It is also an official language in the union territories of Daman and Diu and Dadra and Nagar Haveli. According to the Central Intelligence Agency (CIA), 4.5% of population of India (1.21 billion according to 2011 census) speaks Gujarati. This amounts to 54.6 million speakers in India.

Kannada

Kannada is a Dravidian language which branched off from Kannada-Tamil sub group around 500 B.C.E according to the Dravidian scholar Zvelebil. It is the official language of Karnataka. According to the Dravidian scholars Steever and Krishnamurthy, the study of Kannada language is usually divided into three linguistic phases: Old (450–1200 CE), Middle (1200–1700 CE) and Modern (1700–present). The earliest written records are from the 5th century, and the earliest available literature in rich manuscript (Kavirajamarga) is from c. 850. Kannada language has the second oldest written tradition of all languages of India. Current estimates of the total number of epigraph present in Karnataka range from 25,000 by the scholar Sheldon Pollock to over 30,000 by the Sahitya Akademi, making Karnataka state "one of the most densely inscribed pieces of real estate in the world". According to Garg and Shipely, more than a thousand notable writers have contributed to the wealth of the language.

Malayalam

Malayalam has official language status in the state of Kerala and in the union territories of Lakshadweep and Puducherry. It belongs to the Dravidian family of languages and is spoken by some 38 million people. Malayalam is also spoken in the neighboring states of Tamil Nadu and Karnataka; with some speakers in the Nilgiris, Kanyakumari and Coimbatore districts of Tamil Nadu, and the Dakshina Kannada and the Kodagu district of Karnataka. Malayalam originated from Middle Tamil (Sen-Tamil) in the 7th century. As Malayalam began to freely borrow words as well as the rules of grammar from Sanskrit, the Grantha alphabet was adopted for writing and came to be known as Arya Eluttu. This developed into the modern Malayalam script.

Odia

Odia (formerly spelled Oriya) is the only modern language officially recognized as a classical language from the Indo-Aryan group. Odia is primarily spoken and has official language status in the Indian state of Odisha and has over 40 million speakers. It was declared as a classical language of India in 2014. Native speakers comprise 91.85% of the population in Odisha. Odia originated from Odra Prakrit which developed from Magadhi Prakrit, a language spoken in eastern India over 2,500 years ago. The history of Odia language can be divided to Old Odia (3rd century BC −1200 century AD), Early Middle Odia (1200–1400), Middle Odia (1400–1700), Late Middle Odia (1700–1870) and Modern Odia (1870 until present day). The National Manuscripts Mission of India have found around 213,000 unearthed and preserved manuscripts written in Odia.

Santali 

Santali is a Munda languages, a branch of Austroasiatic languages spoken widely in Jharkhand and other states of eastern India by Santhal community of tribal and non tribal. It is written in Ol Chiki script invented by Raghunath Murmu at the end of 19th century. Santali is spoken by 0.67% of India's population. About 7 million peoples speak this language. It is also spoken in Bangladesh and Nepal. The language is major tribal language of Jharkhand and thus Santhal community is demanding to make it as the official language of Jharkhand.

Punjabi

Punjabi, written in the Gurmukhi script in India, is one of the prominent languages of India with about 32 million speakers. In Pakistan it is spoken by over 80 million people and is written in the Shahmukhi alphabet. It is mainly spoken in Punjab but also in neighboring areas. It is an official language of Delhi and Punjab.

Assamese

Asamiya or Assamese language is most popular in the state of Assam. It's an Eastern Indo-Aryan language with more than 23 million total speakers including more than 15 million native speakers and more than 7 million L2 speakers as per 2011 Census of India. Along with other Eastern Indo-Aryan languages, Assamese evolved at least before the 7th century CE from the middle Indo-Aryan Magadhi Prakrit. The first characteristics of this language are seen in the Charyapadas composed in between the eighth and twelfth centuries. The first examples emerged in writings of court poets in the fourteenth century, the finest example of which is Madhav Kandali's Saptakanda Ramayana composed during 14th century CE.

Maithili

Maithili (Maithilī) is an Indo-Aryan language native to India and Nepal. In India, it is widely spoken in the Bihar and Jharkhand states. Native speakers are also found in other states and union territories of India, most notably in Uttar Pradesh and the National Capital Territory of Delhi. In the 2011 census of India, It was reported by 1,35,83,464 people as their mother tongue comprising about 1.12% of the total population of India.
In Nepal, it is spoken in the eastern Terai, and is the second most prevalent language of Nepal. Tirhuta was formerly the primary script for written Maithili. Less commonly, it was also written in the local variant of Kaithi. Today it is written in the Devanagari script.

In 2003, Maithili was included in the Eighth Schedule of the Indian Constitution as a recognised regional language of India, which allows it to be used in education, government, and other official contexts.

Classical languages of India

In 2004, the Government of India declared that languages that met certain requirements could be accorded the status of a "Classical Language" of India.

Languages thus far declared to be Classical:
 Tamil (in 2004),
 Sanskrit (in 2005),
 Kannada (in 2008),
 Telugu (in 2008),
 Malayalam (in 2013),
 Odia (in 2014).

Over the next few years, several languages were granted the Classical status, and demands have been made for other languages, including Pali, Bengali, Marathi and Meitei (officially called Manipuri).

Other local languages and dialects
The 2001 census identified the following native languages having more than one million speakers. Most of them are dialects/variants grouped under Hindi.

Practical problems 
India has several languages in use; choosing any single language as an official language presents problems to all those whose "mother tongue" is different. However, all the boards of education across India recognise the need for training people to one common language. There are complaints that in North India, non-Hindi speakers have language trouble. Similarly, there are complaints that North Indians have to undergo difficulties on account of language when travelling to South India. It is common to hear of incidents that result due to friction between those who strongly believe in the chosen official language, and those who follow the thought that the chosen language(s) do not take into account everyone's preferences. Local official language commissions have been established and various steps are being taken in a direction to reduce tensions and friction.

Language policy 

The Union Government of India formulated the Three language formula.

In the Prime Minister's Office 

The official website of the Prime Minister's Office of India publishes its official information in 11 Indian official languages, namely Assamese, Bengali, Gujarati, Kannada, Malayalam, Meitei (Manipuri), Marathi, Odia, Punjabi, Tamil and Telugu, out of the 22 official languages of the Indian Republic, in addition to English and Hindi.

In the Press Information Bureau 

The Press Information Bureau (PIB) selects 14 Indian official languages, which are Dogri, Punjabi, Bengali, Oriya, Gujarati, Marathi, Meitei (Manipuri), Tamil, Kannada, Telugu, Malayalam, Konkani and Urdu, in addition to Hindi and English, out of the 22 official languages of the Indian Republic to render its information about all the Central Government press releases.

In the Staff Selection Commission 

The Staff Selection Commission (SSC) selected 13 Indian official languages, which are Urdu, Tamil, Malayalam, Telugu, Kannada, Assamese, Bengali, Gujarati, Konkani, Meitei (Manipuri), Marathi, Odia and Punjabi, in addition to Hindi and English, out of the 22 official languages of the Indian Republic, to conduct the Multi-Tasking (Non-Technical) Staff examination for the first time in its history.

Language conflicts

There are conflicts over linguistic rights in India. The first major linguistic conflict, known as the Anti-Hindi agitations of Tamil Nadu, took place in Tamil Nadu against the implementation of Hindi as the official language of India. Political analysts consider this as a major factor in bringing DMK to power and leading to the ousting and nearly total elimination of the Congress party in Tamil Nadu. Strong cultural pride based on language is also found in other Indian states such as Assam, Odisha, Karnataka, West Bengal, Punjab and Maharashtra. To express disapproval of the imposition of Hindi on its states' people as a result of the central government, the government of Maharashtra made the state language Marathi mandatory in educational institutions of CBSE and ICSE through Class/Grade 10.

The Government of India attempts to assuage these conflicts with various campaigns, coordinated by the Central Institute of Indian Languages, Mysore, a branch of the Department of Higher Education, Language Bureau, and the Ministry of Human Resource Development.

Linguistic movements 
In the history of India, various linguistic movements were and are undertaken by different literary, political and social associations as well as organisations, advocating for the changes and the developments of several languages, dialects and vernaculars in diverse critical, discriminative and unfavorable circumstances and situations.

Bengali 

 Bengali language movement in India

Meitei (Manipuri) 

 Meitei language movements (aka Manipuri language movements), various linguistic movements for the cause of Meitei language (officially called Manipuri language)
 Meitei linguistic purism movement, an ongoing linguistic movement, aimed to attain linguistic purism in Meitei language
 Scheduled language movement, a historical linguistic movement in Northeast India, aimed at the recognition of Meitei language as one of the scheduled languages of Indian Republic
 Meitei classical language movement, an ongoing linguistic movement in Northeast India, aimed at the recognition of Meitei language as an officially recognized "classical language"
 Meitei associate official language movement, a semi active linguistic movement in Northeast India, aimed at the recognition of Meitei language as an "associate" official language of Assam

Rajasthani 

 Rajasthani language movement, a linguistic movement that has been campaigning for greater recognition for the Rajasthani language since 1947

Tamil 

 Tanittamil Iyakkam (Pure Tamil Movement), a linguistic purism movement for the Tamil language, to ignore the loanwords borrowed from Sanskrit

Developmental works 
In the age of technological advancements, the Google Translate supports the following Indian languages: Bengali, Gujarati, Hindi, Kannada, Malayalam, Marathi, Meiteilon (Manipuri) (in Meitei script), Odia, Punjabi (in Gurmukhi script), Sanskrit, Tamil, Telugu, Urdu.

Meitei (Manipuri) 

On the 4 September 2013, the Directorate of Language Planning and Implementation was established for the development and the promotion of Meitei language (officially called Manipuri language) and the Meitei script (Manipuri script) in Manipur.

In September 2021, the Central Government of India released  as the first instalment for the development and the promotion of the Meitei language (officially called Manipuri language) and the Meitei script (Manipuri script) in Manipur.

Sanskrit 

The Central Government of India allocated ₹643.84 crore in the last three years for the development and the promotion of Sanskrit, ₹231.15 crore in 2019–20, around ₹214.38 crore in 2018–19, and ₹198.31 crore in 2017–18.

Tamil 

The Central Government of India gave an allocation of Rs 10.59 crore in 2017–18, Rs 4.65 crore in 2018–19 and Rs 7.7 crore in 2019–20 to the "Central Institute of Classical Tamil" for the development and the promotion of Tamil language.

Telugu and Kannada 

The Central Government of India gave an allocation of Rs 1 crore in 2017–18, Rs 99 lakh in 2018–19 and Rs 1.07 crore in 2019–20, each for the development and the promotion of Telugu language and Kannada language.

Writing systems 

Most languages in India are written in scripts derived from Brahmi. These include Devanagari, Tamil, Telugu, Kannada, Meitei Mayek, Odia, Eastern Nagari – Assamese/Bengali, Gurumukhi and other. Urdu is written in a script derived from Arabic. A few minor languages such as Santali use independent scripts (see Ol Chiki script).

Various Indian languages have their own scripts. Hindi, Marathi, Maithili and Angika are languages written using the Devanagari script. Most major languages are written using a script specific to them, such as Assamese (Asamiya) with Asamiya, Bengali with Bengali, Punjabi with Gurmukhi, Meitei with Meitei Mayek, Odia with Odia script, Gujarati with Gujarati, etc. Urdu and Kashmiri, Saraiki and Sindhi are written in modified versions of the Perso-Arabic script. With this one exception, the scripts of Indian languages are native to India. Languages like Kodava that didn't have a script whereas Tulu which had a script adopted Kannada due to its readily available printing settings; these languages have taken up the scripts of the local official languages as their own and are written in the Kannada script.

See also
List of endangered languages in India
List of languages by number of native speakers in India
National Translation Mission
Romanization of Sindhi
Indo-Portuguese creoles
Languages of China
Languages of Pakistan
Languages of Bangladesh
Languages of Sri Lanka
Languages of Maldives
Languages of Nepal
Languages of Bhutan
Languages of Myanmar
Languages of Malaysia
Languages of Singapore
Languages of Mauritius
Languages of Réunion
Languages of Fiji
Languages of Guyana
Languages of Trinidad and Tobago
Tamil diaspora
Telugu diaspora
Caribbean Hindustani
Fiji Hindi

Notes

References

External links

 Linguistic map of India with a detailed map of the Seven Sister States (India) at Muturzikin.com
 Languages and Scripts of India
 Diversity of Languages in India
 A comprehensive federal government site that offers complete info on Indian Languages
 Technology Development for Indian Languages, Government of India
Languages Spoken in Himachal Pradesh – Himachal Pariksha

 
Demographics of India